Jacques Jouet (born 9 October 1947) is a French writer and has been a participating member of the Oulipo literary project since 1983.

He is a poet, novelist, short story writer, playwright, essayiste, and plasticine artist specializing in collages. As a member of l'Oulipo, Jouet became its focus in June 2009 when he began publicly writing a serialized novel in five days. He first became involved with Oulipo in 1978, stemming from a writing course directed by Paul Fournel, Georges Perec, and Jacques Roubaud.

His serial The Republic of Mek Ouyes was broadcast simultaneously on radio and on the web, through the site of his publisher, P.O.L.

Jouet wrote Poèmes de métro while riding the underground trains of the Paris Métro.

Works
(incomplete list)

Literary
 Le directeur du Musée des cadeaux des chefs d'État de l'étranger
 Annette et l'Etna
 Poèmes de Métro (Poems of the Paris Underground)
 Mon bel autocar (My Beautiful Bus)
 Actes de la machine ronde
 L'amour comme on l'apprend à l'école hôtelière
 Une mauvaise maire
 MRM (Max Jacob Prize 2009)

Collected works
 Numerous volumes of La Bibliothèque oulipienne, Seghers and Le Castor astral
 Les Papous dans la tête, l'anthologie, with  Bertrand Jérôme and Françoise Treussard, Gallimard, 2007
 Le Dictionnaire des Papous dans la tête, with Françoise Treussard, Gallimard, 2007

Théâtre
(incomplete list)

 Mitterrand et Sankara, staged in 2005, reopened in 2008 at the Théâtre Nanterre-Amandiers
 La République de Mek Ouyes, staged in 2006 at the Théâtre Nanterre-Amandiers
 L'amour au travail
 La chatte bottée

References

External links
 Jacques Jouet on l'Oulipo

1947 births

Oulipo members
Living people
French male writers